Hobak-tteok is a variety of siru-tteok (steamed rice cake) made by mixing fresh or dried pumpkin with glutinous or non-glutinous rice flour, then steaming the mixture in a siru (rice cake steamer).

Preparation 
Washed pumpkin, preferably Korean cheese pumpkin called cheongdung-hobak, is minced after having its seeds removed by scraping. It is then mixed with rice flour and (optionally) sugar, and then sieved. Hobak-goji (julienned and dried pumpkin pieces) may replace the minced fresh pumpkin, in which case the flour is sieved before the addition of pumpkin pieces. Chestnuts, jujubes, red beans, and/or black beans may also be added to the sieved flour mixture. Finally, it is steamed in siru (steamer).

See also 
 Tteok, Korean rice cakes
 Cucurbita moschata, Korean pumpkin
 List of squash and pumpkin dishes

References 

Squash and pumpkin dishes
Steamed foods
Tteok